Radif (meaning order) is a rule in Persian, Turkic, and Urdu poetry which states that, in the form of poetry known as a ghazal, the second line of all the couplets (s or shers) must end with the same word. It is preceded by a qaafiyaa, which is a repeating pattern of words.

The following is an example of a ghazal by Daag Dehelvi.

References

Persian poetry
Urdu-language poetry
Ghazal
Rhyme